Shanom (born Luis Antonio Vázquez) is a Puerto Rican  personality who reached the height of his popularity between the mid-1980s and 2000s. Shanom is best known for his musical parodies, comedy stunts and his political satire. 

Shanom had the second longest-running morning show in the island of Puerto Rico up to 2004 and has received countless distinctions for his radio work as well as his charitable work for the handicapped. Luis's stage name was "created" by another famous radio personality; José Vallenilla a.k.a. "Funky Joe" who hired him as an assistant producer for a popular morning show (El Meneo, WOYE FM, Cosmos 94) where, because of the nature of the presentation he was motivated to create countless parodies and bits that had to compete with the best in the business, which was probably what developed his comedy production style. Later he became the director of the show. Being a musician Luis, had the added benefit of producing very convincing reproductions of the songs he parodied and this became his signature.  As a radio producer, he holds two outstanding distinctions: longest-running morning show at the number one spot in its market (WOYE FM and WCMN, Delta) and as "the most gimmicks and elements produced for a morning show" to date. Also on this show, he included numerous outstanding features that brought continued attention such as his Soap Opera's parodies, political musical satire, live gimmicks and presentations, and even a "mentalist" (ELSIE), whose predictions were 100% accurate at the time and gained momentum. International stars and many internet "firsts" placed El Meneo at the top of pop culture at the time. But it was Shanom's interviews and productions that impacted the most, gaining various features in the island news. 

Influenced by Jose Vallenilla AKA; Funky Joe, he produced some of the first-ever "reggaeton" albums, a Puerto Rican insular genre that became known worldwide as an Urban Genre, but this remained underground at the time. He focused mainly on radio parodies for which he was becoming an icon in his market. It was through his radio show that the first ever commercially produced "Latin Rap" album was released when "Prime Records" a local company signed a young artist known as Vico C and it was picked up by a Spanish international Record Company. Shanom then went on to "makeover" his personal presentations to include the new developing genre and brought it to the mainlight. It was thru this that artists like "Dinamic two", "Vico-C", "Evy Queen" and Falo" found their very first outlets to bring their brand of music into the spotlight. (Without Vico C, Dinamic Two and Evy Queen the reggaeton genre would probably not exist.)

Shanom is credited for having launched the career of many radio professionals in the island, mainly young aspiring students who later became active radio professionals. Some of his most outstanding parodies include a song that was created for the then-upcoming movie "Batman" (La Baticueva) an original song that gained international attention and also the early salsa versions of Michael Jackson's songs. This song became the most successful parody ever recorded in PR and was a hit in both The Americas and Europe. Shanom's parodies continued to impress the audience and that lead to yet another album, this time featuring most of Luis's work and out of the control of the radio station. 

He produced a morning show with international actor "Braulio Castillo" and local diva Mirayda Chavez and co-produced a radio network dedicated to children. Luis was instrumental in the revolution of internet radio in PR.  Shanom later paired with one of his students and launched a successful internet radio station dedicated to [reggaeton]: Radio Actitud. This radio station has been re-broadcast in FM radio in both Mexico and Perú and helped launch the careers of various reggaeton artists.  He currently works an adviser to radio stations in the island and the mainland. Shanom belongs to the elite group of DJ's that is credited for having developed the new style of radio in America including (but not limited to)air personalities from Puerto Rico such as: Antonio Sánchez (El Gangster) José Vallenilla (Funky Joe), Pepe García, Billy Furket, Red Shadow, Franky Jay, Gilbert Merle, etc. And in the Mainland: Rick Dees, Paco Rabanne, Howard Stern, Ryan Seacrest, etc. Shanom co-produces the Mayagüez Jazz and the Puerto Rico Strongest People Search event.

References
 la Nueva Enciclopedia de Medios 2005, editorial Navarro, radio personalities
 Gilbert Merle
El Meneo

 Living people
Year of birth missing (living people)
 American radio personalities